Jim McKay is an Australian professional rugby union football coach. He is currently the head coach of the Brisbane City team that plays in the NRC competition, and also assistant coach of the Queensland Reds assisting the Reds to premierships in 2011 and 2021. Former assistant coach Australian Wallabies Rugby Union Football team. McKay had previously coached the Cornish Pirates UK and Kobelco Steelers Japan.

References

Living people
Australian rugby union coaches
1966 births